is a Japanese rock band, formed in 1973 by five musicians in Asahikawa, Hokkaidō, Japan. It debuted in 1982 in Tokyo, Japan. They became one of Japan's most successful rock bands in the 1980s.

Members
 - Vocals, Guitars & Percussion (1973–present)
 - Guitars (1973–present)
 - Guitars (1977–present)
 Bass, Piano & Keyboards (1977–present)

Past members
 - Guitars, Keyboards (1973–1981)
 - Bass (1973–1978)
 - Drums (1973–1977)
 - Drums (1977–1982)
 - Drums (1977–1978, 1982–died 2022)

History

1970s: Beginnings 
Formed in 1973 as the high-school garage band Invader in Asahikawa, Hokkaidō, its original members included vocalist Koji Tamaki, guitarist Yutaka Takezawa and guitarist/keyboardist Toshiya Takezawa, who is also Yutaka's brother. Later, in late 1973, Koji's brother and drummer, Kazuyoshi Tamaki and bassist Takahiro Miyashita joined. In 1977, the band changed its name to Anzen Chitai ("Safety Zone"), and Kazuyoshi Tamaki left the group to be replaced by Ichiji Ohira. By this point, they had expanded to an eight-member group. Within the next three years, Toshiya Takezawa and Takahiro Miyashita left. Yuji Tanaka also left at this point.

1980s: Commercial success 
In 1981, they began work as a backup band for singer-songwriter Yōsui Inoue, and released their debut single,  under the Kitty Records in February 1982. However, the final personnel change occurred as Ichiji Ohira left, and Yuji Tanaka returned in his place, establishing the current lineup.

Under the guidance of their producer and co-arranger , lead guitarist and vocalist of the psychedelic rock group The Mops, the band continued to refine their craft in the studio. Their status as a backup band soon changed: in 1984,  reached No. 1 on the Oricon charts, to be followed by among others, "Kanashimi ni Sayonara" (悲しみにさよなら) and "Suki Sa" (好きさ) (featured on the popular Rumiko Takahashi anime series Maison Ikkoku). "Wine Red no Kokoro" was composed by Koji Tamaki with lyrics by Yōsui Inoue. Koji Tamaki was credited as the sole composer in virtually all of Anzen Chitai's music, with Gorō Matsui being the lyricist frequently. Their popularity in the 1980s culminated in a five-day soldout concert tour at the Nippon Budokan in 1987, which had a total attendance of 60,000.

1990s and 2000s: Frequent hiatuses 
Despite a couple of hiatuses for the sake of solo careers (July 1988-March 1990, 1993–2001), Anzen Chitai continued to record and tour. A new studio album was released in October 2003, titled Anzen Chitai X (their tenth studio album). After their Japanese concert tour in support of the "Anzen Chitai X" album, the band announced at the end of 2003 that they are taking yet another indefinite hiatus.

As of 2006, Koji Tamaki remains active as a solo performer and television actor, with Wataru Yahagi performing in both his solo albums and concerts.  Yutaka Takezawa is also active in the music business as a composer, producer, arranger and session guitarist.

On April 28, 2008, fan club members were notified that Tamaki has announced his retirement from music, as well as the closing of the official Koji Tamaki & Anzenchitai fan club, Star.  Illness that requires long-term treatment was cited for his decision.

During the second half of 2009, the band held secret meetings and decided to regroup.  Similar to their amateur days, band members lodged together to practise and compose music.

2010–present: Returning from hiatus 
On January 8, 2010, the band announced the resumption of their career along with making appearance on the television program Tokudane!. Switching back to Universal Music Japan (which has absorbed their former label Kitty Records and is the distributor of their pre-Sony Music Japan catalog) as their record label, a music video for their new single "Aoi Bara" was released.

Their double A-side single "Aoi Bara/Wine Red no Kokoro (2010 version)" was released on March 3, 2010. Tamaki wrote the lyrics and music of "Aoi Bara." The single debuted at #9 on Oricon weekly charts, becoming their first Top 10 single in 21 years 6 months since their single "Hohoemi ni Kanpai" in 1988.

On May 26, 2010, Anzen Chitai released their first album in nearly 7 years, Anzenchitai 11 Starts "Mata ne. . .". Alongside this new album, they released Anzen Chitai Hits on June 30, 2010. This album encapsulated the rerecorded versions of their singles throughout the 1980s.

Discography

Singles

Albums

References

External links
Anzen Chitai's Official Website (in Japanese)
 Official Website

Japanese rock music groups
Sony Music Entertainment Japan artists
Musical groups established in 1973
Musical groups from Hokkaido